The Barros Rocks are a group of rocks between the Berthelot Islands and the Argentine Islands, lying  southwest of Cape Tuxen off the west coast of Graham Land. They were discovered by the French Antarctic Expedition, 1908–10, under Jean-Baptiste Charcot, and named after Captain Barros Cobra, a Brazilian naval officer at Rio de Janeiro, who assisted the expedition.

References 

Rock formations of the Wilhelm Archipelago